Mario Brian "Tiger" Chitaroni (born June 11, 1967) is an Italian-Canadian retired professional ice hockey winger.  He played major junior with the Sudbury Wolves but went undrafted playing minor pro in the AHL before moving to Italy where he eventually captained their national team.

International play
Mario played in the Olympics in 1998, 2006, and helped Italy try to qualify for 2002 and 2010.  Additionally he represented Italy in the World Championships fourteen times, being the captain in 2007 and 2008.

Career statistics

Regular season and playoffs

International

References

External links
 
 Elite prospects

1967 births
Living people
Canadian ice hockey forwards
Canadian people of Italian descent
HC Milano players
Ice hockey people from Ontario
Ice hockey players at the 1998 Winter Olympics
Ice hockey players at the 2006 Winter Olympics
Italian ice hockey players
Olympic ice hockey players of Italy
People from Cobalt, Ontario
Sudbury Wolves players
Flint Spirits players
New Haven Nighthawks players
Houston Aeros (1994–2013) players
Canadian expatriate ice hockey players in Italy